Leptosiphon montanus (syn. Linanthus montanus) is a species of flowering plant in the phlox family known by the common name mustang clover.

Distribution
It is endemic to California.

Description
Leptosiphon montanus is an annual herb producing a thin, hairy stem up to 60 centimeters tall. The leaves are divided into needle-like linear lobes each 2 or 3 centimeters in length.

The inflorescence is a head of small but showy flowers. Each flower has a long, hairy, dark red tube up to 3 centimeters long spreading into a flat corolla. The corolla lobes are white or light to deep pink marked with reddish spots at the yellow and white throat.  Its bloom period is from April to July.

See also

References

External links
Calflora Database: Leptosiphon montanus (Mustang clover)
Jepson Manual eFlora (TJM2) treatment of Leptosiphon montanus

montanus
Endemic flora of California
Flora of the Sierra Nevada (United States)
Natural history of the California chaparral and woodlands
Flora without expected TNC conservation status